Reuven Dafni (born Ruben Kandt; 1913 in Zagreb – 2005 in Israel) was a wartime British officer and special forces soldier and a soldier and diplomat for Israel. He was also one of the founders of kibbutz Ein Gev and a longtime assistant director of the Yad Vashem memorial center.

Early life
Dafni was born on November 11, 1913, in Zagreb, in what was then the largely-autonomous region of Croatia-Slavonia in Austria-Hungary. He came from an educated family that was Croatian and Jewish; he had two siblings. At the end of the World War I, the region was united with the Serbia, to form the Kingdom of Yugoslavia.

In the early 1930s, Dafni was studying in Vienna, where his father was a diplomat: he was a keen athlete, a member of the student union and an activist in the Zionist youth movement.

In 1936, Dafni emigrated to Mandatory Palestine, then under British administration, and became one of the founders of kibbutz Ein Gev.

War service
In 1940, he took up arms against the Nazis and joined the British Army. He served in the Greek Campaign and in the Battle of Crete, as well as in the North African Campaign.

In 1942, a new Palestine Regiment, was created and Dafni was one of its soldiers. He also volunteered for training for special operations.

In mid-March 1944, along with several other agents, Dafni was parachuted behind enemy lines into occupied Yugoslavia. He met up with the Partisans and kept them in contact with the Western Allies; he spent six months in Croatia.

For his war-service, Warrant Officer (Company Sergeant-Major) Dafni was recognised with a Mention in Despatches (MiD). He was also commissioned as an officer.

Post-war
Eretz Israel
After the war he returned to his kibbutz, but in 1946, as a member of the Haganah, Dafni went to the United States to raise funds and purchase weapons for the defence of the Yishuv; one of his contributors was Bugsy Siegel. Dafni returned to the United States in 1948, now helping to raise funds for the newly established State of Israel.

Diplomat
In 1948, he was also appointed as the first Israeli consul in Los Angeles. From 1953 to 1956, he served as consul general of Israel in New York City. Later, he also served as consul general in Bombay, India, and also served as ambassador to Kenya (1969 to 1973) and Thailand.

Yad Vashem
For 13 years, from 1983 to 1996, Dafni served as assistant director, in Jerusalem, of Yad Vashem: Israel's official memorial to the victims of the Holocaust.

Family life
Dafni was married to Rina (née Grossman) with whom he had two children, a son, Yoram, and a daughter, Avital. The couple later divorced and Dafni remarried twice.

References 

1913 births
2005 deaths
Military personnel from Zagreb
People from the Kingdom of Croatia-Slavonia
Croatian Jews
Austro-Hungarian Jews
Yugoslav emigrants to Mandatory Palestine
Israeli people of Croatian-Jewish descent
Yugoslav Partisans members
Jews in the Yugoslav Partisans
Israeli soldiers
Israeli consuls
Haganah
Burials in Israel
Jewish parachutists of Mandate Palestine
Yad Vashem people
Jewish Brigade personnel
Ambassadors of Israel to Kenya
Ambassadors of Israel to Thailand
Palestine Regiment officers
Special Operations Executive personnel